Marcos Javier Minetti (born 17 April 1989) is an Argentine professional footballer who plays as a midfielder for Atlético Paraná.

Career
Minetti was promoted into Patronato's first-team in 2011, making his professional debut in a Copa Argentina match with Newell's Old Boys on 29 November. In Primera B Nacional, he was an unused substitute five times during 2011–12, prior to making his league debut on 24 February 2012 versus Gimnasia y Esgrima (LP). He was subbed on with eighteen minutes remaining for Marcelo Guzmán, but left the match in stoppage time after receiving a red card. In April 2014, Minetti scored his first career goal during a Copa Argentina loss to Instituto. In 2015, Minetti scored three goals in twenty-five matches as they won promotion.

In the Primera División, he was sent off twice in his first nine appearances. Minetti left Patronato midway through 2019, having not appeared competitively since March 2017 due to a series of injuries. July 2019 saw Minetti join Gimnasia y Esgrima of Torneo Federal A. Ten appearances followed. In January 2020, Minetti agreed a move to Torneo Regional Federal Amateur with Atlético Paraná.

Career statistics
.

References

External links

1989 births
Living people
People from Paraná, Entre Ríos
Argentine footballers
Association football midfielders
Primera Nacional players
Argentine Primera División players
Torneo Federal A players
Club Atlético Patronato footballers
Gimnasia y Esgrima de Concepción del Uruguay footballers
Club Atlético Paraná players
Sportspeople from Entre Ríos Province